Thibault Guernalec (born 31 July 1997) is a French cyclist, who currently rides for UCI ProTeam .

Major results

2015
 1st Stage 2 Ronde des Vallées
 6th Chrono des Nations Juniors
2016
 3rd Time trial, National Under-23 Road Championships
2017
 2nd Time trial, National Under-23 Road Championships
 5th Chrono des Nations U23
2018
 3rd Time trial, National Under-23 Road Championships
2019
 1st  Time trial, National Under-23 Road Championships
8th Chrono des Nations U23 
 10th Overall Tour Poitou-Charentes en Nouvelle-Aquitaine
2020
 4th Overall Tour Poitou-Charentes en Nouvelle-Aquitaine
1st  Young rider classification
 4th Overall Vuelta a Murcia
 5th Time trial, National Road Championships
2021
 6th Overall Volta ao Algarve
2022
 5th Time trial, National Road Championships
 8th Overall Volta ao Algarve
 8th Overall Étoile de Bessèges
 9th Overall Circuit de la Sarthe
2023
 7th Grand Prix La Marseillaise

References

External links

1997 births
Living people
French male cyclists
People from Châteaulin
Sportspeople from Finistère
Cyclists from Brittany